Sharon Sasson(or Sasson; born March 16, 1979) is a retired Israeli  basketball player. A 6' 9" (206 cm) forward, he last played for Bnei HaSharon.

Sasson signed with Hapoel Jerusalem in August 2007. He had spent the last two seasons with Maccabi Tel Aviv, who released him from the final year of a three-year contract after he averaged just 3.2 points per game in 44 Euroleague games. Shason averaged 10.7 points per game with Hapoel Jerusalem during the 2007-08 season, with a high of 35 points against Ironi Ashkelon.

On 31 August 2011 he retired from the game. He scored 2,036 points in 240 games in the Israeli Basketball Super League, and represented the Israeli national basketball team scoring 318 points in 56 games.

Honours
Israeli Basketball Super League:
Winner (2): 2006, 2007
Israeli Basketball State Cup:
Winner (2): 2006, 2008
Euroleague:
Runner-up (1): 2006

Notes

1978 births
Living people
Israeli men's basketball players
Israeli Basketball Premier League players
Ironi Nahariya players
Maccabi Tel Aviv B.C. players
Hapoel Jerusalem B.C. players
Small forwards
PBC Ural Great players
Israeli people of Iraqi-Jewish descent
People from Givatayim